Early general elections were held in Sweden between 27 March and 7 April 1914, after the Riksdag had been prematurely dissolved by the Cabinet of Hjalmar Hammarskjöld. The General Electoral League emerged as the largest party, winning 86 of the 230 seats in the Second Chamber. As of 2022, this is the last time a Swedish election has not seen the Social Democrats win a plurality of seats.

Results

References

2014 03
Sweden
General
Sweden